Robert Caplin (born 1983, in United States) is an American photographer and cinematographer. Since 2005, Caplin has photographed over 800 assignments for The New York Times and has contributed to and has been published by hundreds of local, national, and international newspapers and magazines including National Geographic, Los Angeles Times, Sports Illustrated, ESPN The Magazine, USA Today, The Sunday Times, Newsweek, Time, Us Weekly, and Vanity Fair. In 2010 Caplin spent six months on the road with and documented the international pop singer Justin Bieber and along with HarperCollins, put together Bieber's illustrated biography consisting of Bieber's words and Caplin's photos. The biography, Justin Bieber: First Step 2 Forever: My Story spent 14 weeks on The New York Times Best Seller list and has sold over 1 million copies in 25 languages. Caplin's video documentation of Bieber on tour was released as part of Paramount Pictures' movie Justin Bieber: Never Say Never.

He assignments range from celebrity portraiture, news, travel, documentary, corporate, advertising, food, and events.

Caplin grew up in Athens, Ohio where he also attended Ohio University's School of Visual Communication majoring in Photojournalism in 2005. He currently lives in Manhattan.

References

External links 
 

1983 births
Living people
American portrait photographers
American cinematographers